is a women's football club playing in Japan's football league, Tokai.League Div.1. Its hometown is Shimizu.

Squad

Current squad
As of 7 June 2015

Honors

Domestic competitions
Empress's Cup All-Japan Women's Football Tournament
Champions (7) : 1980, 1981, 1982, 1983, 1984, 1985, 1986''
Runners-up (2) : 1979, 1987

Results

Transition of team nameShimizudaihachi SC : 1978 – 2006Shimizudaihachi Pleiades''' : 2007 – Present

References

External links
 Shimizudaihachi Pleiades official site
 Japanese Club Teams

Women's football clubs in Japan
Association football clubs established in 1991
1991 establishments in Japan
Sports teams in Shizuoka Prefecture